Return migration might refer to:
Repatriation, the voluntary or involuntary return of travellers and migrants to their place of origin
Circular migration, a phenomenon in human migration in which migrants repeatedly travel between origin and destination countries

See also
Reverse migration (disambiguation)